Stirol is a currently closed down plant and one of the oldest manufacturers of nitrogen fertilizers in Ukraine. It is part of bigger chemical holding Ostchem Holding which unites several other chemical plants in Ukraine and some former Soviet republics that specialize in manufacturing of fertilizers.

The plant was built in 1933 and became the first manufacturer in the Soviet Union that obtained ammonia from a coke gas. "Stirol" means styrene.

"Stirol" is located in Horlivka and used to employs 4,500 people.  The plant became situated in the separatist identity Donetsk People's Republic in the ongoing War in Donbass. Separatists authorities have not been able to keep the plant open.

See also
 2013 Chemical accident in Horlivka

References

External links
 Company Overview of Public Joint Stock Company Concern Stirol. Bloomberg.

Chemical companies of Ukraine
Chemical companies of the Soviet Union